The U.S. state of Alaska has three state forests, which are managed by the Division of Forestry of the Department of Natural Resources.

Alaska state forests
 Haines State Forest - Haines Borough
 Southeast State Forest - Prince of Wales-Hyder Census Area
 Tanana Valley State Forest - Fairbanks North Star Borough

See also
 List of U.S. National Forests

External links
 Division of Forestry - Alaska's State Forests

State forests

Alaska State Forests
Alaska